Intervision may refer to:
the Intervision Network, the Eastern European equivalent of the Eurovision Network
the Intervision Song Contest organised by the Intervision Network
Intervision (album), a 1997 album by Jimi Tenor
Intervision, a brief orchestral composition by Dmitri Shostakovich commissioned by the Intervision Network in 1971 for use in its broadcasts.

See also
Eurovision (disambiguation)